Kentucky Route 77 (KY 77) is a  long state highway in Kentucky that runs from Kentucky Route 11 and Kentucky Route 15 northwest of Slade to U.S. Route 460 southeast of Frenchburg.

Major intersections

References

0077
Transportation in Menifee County, Kentucky